Il Becco Giallo (Italian: 'Yellow Beak') was an antifascist satirical magazine in the 1920s in Italy. The magazine existed between 1924 and 1926.

History
Il Becco Giallo was founded by Alberto Giannini in 1924, and the first issue appeared on 13 January that year. The editorial column of the first issue sided clearly against fascism:

[...] we support [...] with all our energy the opposition, which heroically resists the fascist regime of dictatorial violence that has inverted all moral values and through terrorism enslaved Italy to a band of raiders, and defies every day the most brutal aggression and struggle for suppressed freedom for the trampled thousand-year old Italian justice, for the restoration of constitutional guarantees, to restore prestige to Italy in the world.

Il Becco Giallo was based in Rome. The editor-in-chief of the magazine which was published on a weekly basis was Alberto Cianca. One of the contributors was Stefano Siglienti. Luigi Pirandello, for his devotion to Benito Mussolini, was one of Il Becco Giallo's satirical targets, and used to be called P.Randello (randello in Italian means 'club (weapon)'). In 1926 the fascist regime forced Giannini to close it and emigrate to France. Editor-in-chief Alberto Cianca also fled to Paris where he managed to continue to publish Il Becco Giallo.

In the same period, two magazines emerged in Italy that were characterized for developing an innovative surreal humour, the Bertoldo and the Marc'Aurelio; the authors of these magazines were reactionaries that avoided political satire to comply with the regime.

See also

 List of magazines in Italy

Notes

Further reading
 Oreste Del Buono, Lietta Tornabuoni (Eds.) (1972) Il becco giallo, Feltrinelli,
Il becco giallo. La satira di sinistra, a cura di Walter Marossi, Milano, M&B Publishing, 1999

1924 establishments in Italy
1926 disestablishments in Italy
Anti-fascism in Italy
Defunct political magazines published in Italy
Humor magazines
Italian-language magazines
Magazines established in 1924
Magazines disestablished in 1926
Magazines published in Rome
Satirical magazines published in Italy
Weekly magazines published in Italy
Censorship in Italy